The list of ship commissionings in 2012 includes a chronological list of all ships commissioned in 2012.


See also

2012